The canton of Pardiac-Rivière-Basse is an administrative division of the Gers department, southwestern France. It was created at the French canton reorganisation which came into effect in March 2015. Its seat is in Plaisance.

Composition

It consists of the following communes:
 
Armentieux
Armous-et-Cau
Bars
Bassoues
Beaumarchés
Blousson-Sérian
Castelnau-d'Anglès
Cazaux-Villecomtal
Couloumé-Mondebat
Courties
Estipouy
Galiax
L'Isle-de-Noé
Izotges
Jû-Belloc
Juillac
Ladevèze-Rivière
Ladevèze-Ville
Lasserrade
Laveraët
Louslitges
Marciac
Mascaras
Monclar-sur-Losse
Monlezun
Monpardiac
Montesquiou
Mouchès
Pallanne
Plaisance
Pouylebon
Préchac-sur-Adour
Ricourt
Saint-Aunix-Lengros
Saint-Christaud
Saint-Justin
Scieurac-et-Flourès
Sembouès
Tasque
Tieste-Uragnoux
Tillac
Tourdun
Troncens

Councillors

Pictures of the canton

References

Cantons of Gers